Commonwealth Mountain is a mountain on Ellesmere Island, Nunavut, Canada. It lies in western Quttinirpaaq National Park, which is the most northerly extent of Canada, and is the second most northerly park on Earth after Northeast Greenland National Park.

See also
List of mountains of Canada

References

Arctic Cordillera
Two-thousanders of Nunavut